The Iron Woman is a 1916 American silent drama film directed by Carl Harbaugh. The film is considered to be lost.

Cast
 Nance O'Neil as Sarah Maitland
 Einar Linden as David Ritchie
 Alfred Hickman as Blair Maitland
 Evelyn Brent as Nannie Maitland
 Vera Sisson as Elizabeth Ferguson
 William Postance as Robert Ferguson
 Christine Mayo as Helena Ritchie

References

External links

1916 films
1916 drama films
1916 lost films
Silent American drama films
American silent feature films
American black-and-white films
Films directed by Carl Harbaugh
Films based on American novels
Lost American films
Lost drama films
Metro Pictures films
1910s American films